The Dangerous Dub is a 1926 American silent Western film. Directed by Richard Thorpe, the film stars Buddy Roosevelt, Peggy Montgomery, and Joseph Girard. It was released on July 4, 1926.

Synopsis 
Buddy Martin, a cattle driver, is in love with Rose Cooper, whom he met in Omaha. Thanks to her, he finds a job in the ranch of Rose's mother. He will discover a plot between Rose's father-in-law and an outlaw, and will succeed in blaming them and then marrying Rose.

Cast list
 Buddy Roosevelt as Buddy Martin
 Peggy Montgomery as Rose Cooper
 Joseph Girard as W. J. Cooper
 Fanny Midgley as Mrs. Cooper
 Al Taylor as Scar-Face Hanan
 Curley Riviere as the law

References

1926 Western (genre) films
American black-and-white films
Associated Exhibitors films
Films directed by Richard Thorpe
Silent American Western (genre) films
1920s English-language films
1920s American films